Branis is a town and commune in Biskra Province, Algeria. According to the 1998 census it has a population of 4,976.

References

Communes of Biskra Province